The 2018 Coupe du Sénégal is the 56th edition of the Coupe du Sénégal, the knockout football competition of Senegal.

Preliminary round
[Feb ?]
Thiossane Passy        lt  Nguelemou

First round
[Feb 14,15]

Diambars FC            bt  ASC Dahra

Stade de Mbour         lt  Olympique de Ngor

Jaraaf                 lt  Jamono Fatick

US Ouakam              bt  Yeggo Foot Pro

CNEPS de Thiès         bt  RS Yoff 

Africa Promo Foot      lt  Kaolack FC

US Gorée               bt  Ndar Guedj 

Mbour PC               bt  UCST Port 

Cayor Foot             lt  Demba Diop de Mbour 

Académie Darou Salam   bt  Ndiolofène Saint-Louis

Renaissance de Dakar   bt  ASC HLM 

Darou Salam Sébikotane bt  ASC Saloum 

Teungueth FC           bt  Racing de Dakar 

Amitié FC de Thiès     lt  DUC  

Santhiaba Ziguinchor   lt  Sonacos

US Parcelles Assainies lt  NGB Niary Tally 

Etoile Lusitana        lt  AS Douanes 

EJ Fatick              bt  US Rail

Agora                  lt  Linguère de Saint-Louis

Dekkendo de Louga      bt  AJEL de Rufisque

AS Kolda               lt  CSAD de Dakar

Keur Madior            lt  Casa Sports

Kawral de Vélingara    bt  Jeanne d'Arc

ASFA                   lt  ETICS

Génération Foot        bt  Wallydaan de Thiès

Avenir de Mbacké       lt  Louga FC

ASC Cambérène          bt  Olympique de Ziguinchor

Zig Inter Académie     bt  Dakar Sacré-Cœur

Thiès FC               bt  Nguélémou 

Assur                  lt  AS Pikine

Espoirs de Guédiawaye  bt  ASAC Ndiambour

Bargueth de Kébémer    lt  Guédiawaye FC

Second round
Diambars FC            bt  Linguère de Saint-Louis

UA Ouakam              lt  NGB Niary Tally

Demba Diop de Mbour    bt  Mbour PC

Académie Darou Salam   lt  EJ Fatick                                

Guédiawaye FC          lt  Renaissance Dakar

Kaolack FC             bt  ETICS

DUC                    bt  Sonacos

AS Douanes             bt  Casa Sport

ASC Cambéréne          lt  CSAD de Dakar

Espoirs de Guadéwaye   bt  US Gorée     

Jamono Fatick          bt  AS Pikine

Kawral de Vélingara    bt  Louga FC

Génération Foot        bt  Darou Salam Sébikotane

Teungueth FC           4-1 Thiès FC

CNEPS de Thiès         lt  Olympique de Ngor                              

Dekkendo de Louga      bt  Zig Inter Académie

Round of 16
[Mar 29]

Espoirs de Guédiawaye  1-3 Génération Foot

Jamono Fatick          2-1 Demba Diop de Mbour

AS Douanes             0-0 Diambars FC            [4-3 pen]   

CSAD de Dakar          1-0 EJ Fatick

Kawral de Vélingara    3-1 DUC

Renaissance Dakar      2-0 Kaolack FC

Olympique de Ngor      0-1 NGB Niary Tally 

[Apr ?]

Dekkendo de Louga      lt  Teungueth FC

Quarterfinals
[Apr 18-22]

Génération Foot        3-0 CSAD de Dakar

AS Douanes             0-0 Jamono Fatick          [2-3 pen]

NGB Niary Tally        0-1 Renaissance Dakar

Kawral de Vélingara    2-0 Teungueth FC           [aet]

Semifinals
[May 10?]

Génération Foot        4-0 Kawral de Vélingara

Renaissance de Dakar   4-2 Jamono Fatick

Final
[May 20]

Génération Foot        2-0 Renaissance Dakar

See also
2017–18 Senegal Premier League

References

Senegal
Cup
Football competitions in Senegal